Moorhouse may refer to:
 Moorhouse (surname)
 Moorhouse (band), a New Zealand boy band
 Moor House a building in the City of London
 Moorhouse, Allerdale, a hamlet in Allerton District, Cumbria, England
 Moorhouse, Cumbria, a village in Carlisle district, Cumbria, England
 Moorhouse, Nottinghamshire, England
 Moorhouse, South Yorkshire, a location in England

See also
Moorhouse's Brewery
Morehouse (disambiguation)